Placonotus politissimus is a species of lined flat bark beetle in the family Laemophloeidae. It is found in Africa, the Caribbean, Central America, North America, and South America.

References

Further reading

 
 

Laemophloeidae
Articles created by Qbugbot
Beetles described in 1867